Eubacterium nodatum is a Gram positive member of the oral flora of some patients with chronic periodontitis.
It has been recently added to the red complex bacteria, that are most associated with disease.

References

External links
Type strain of Eubacterium nodatum at BacDive -  the Bacterial Diversity Metadatabase

Eubacteriaceae
Bacteria described in 1980